is a 1970 Japanese erotic jidaigeki film directed by Toshiaki Kunihara. The lead star is Masakazu Tamura.

Plot
Source:
The film depicts the battle between female prisoners and officials on an isolated island surrounded by cliffs. There are 11 female prisoners on the prison island and today, Santarō Isahaya who was relegated from the Nagasaki’s governor to island’s administrator due to a scandal and two new female prisoners are coming on the island.

Cast
 Masakazu Tamura as Santarō Isahaya
 Maya Kitajima as Okiyo
 Reiko Kasahara as Oran
 Hiroko Sakurai as Osen
 Keiko Koyanagi as Oseki
 Gen Kimura
 Hiroshi Kondo as Kangoro
 Kazuo Kato as Segoshi

References

External links
 

Jidaigeki films
Samurai films
Daiei Film films
1970s Japanese films